San Francesco is a medieval, Gothic style, Roman Catholic church in the comune of Grosseto, Tuscany, Italy.

History
The church of San Francesco was originally attached to the Benedictine Order and dedicated to San Fortunato. But it was subsequently consigned to the Order of St Francis of Assisi. Rebuilt in 1231, it was consecrated in 1289. The portal has a rose window depicting the Madonna and child and saints, restored in 1927, along with bell tower, by the artist-architect Giuseppe Casucci.

Other than an inferior additions of travertine marble, the church was constructed of brick.  The interior has a large painted crucifix (c. 1289) attributed to Duccio di Boninsegna. The adjacent cloister also preserves the remains of some 13th century frescoes.

The chapel on right is dedicated to St Anthony of Padua, and was decorated with Baroque frescoes (1651-1680) by Francesco Nasini and his brother Antonio. The church faces the small Chiesa dei Bigi, formerly part of a Clarissan convent.

References

Roman Catholic churches in Grosseto
Gothic architecture in Tuscany
13th-century Roman Catholic church buildings in Italy
Churches completed in 1289